Sieglinda Lenk Zigler (July 16, 1919 – December 22, 1986) was an Olympic backstroke swimmer from Brazil who participated at one Summer Olympics for her native country. She is the sister of Maria Lenk. At the 1936 Summer Olympics in Berlin, she swam the 100-metre backstroke, not reaching the finals.

References

1919 births
1986 deaths
Brazilian female backstroke swimmers
Swimmers at the 1936 Summer Olympics
Olympic swimmers of Brazil
Swimmers from São Paulo

Brazilian people of German descent